Ajay Kumar Singh was an Indian Police Service officer who was killed on 4 October 2000 by suspected Maoists. He was Superintendent of Police of Lohardaga district in undivided Bihar at the time of his murder. He was from Begusarai, Bihar.
He was a product of Netarhart School. He did Electrical Engineering from  IIT Kharagpur.

References

Indian police officers killed in the line of duty
Indian Police Service officers
2000 deaths
People from Latehar district
People murdered in Jharkhand
Year of birth missing
2000 murders in India
Bihar Police